Teuvo Johannes Laukkanen (16 July 1919 – 14 May 2011) was a Finnish cross-country skier who competed in the 1940s.

He was born and died in Pielavesi.

He won a silver medal at the 1948 Winter Olympics in St. Moritz in the 4 × 10 km relay.

Cross-country skiing results

Olympic Games

 1 medal – (1 bronze)

External links
Finland's 1948 Winter Olympic medals 
Teuvo Laukkanen's profile at DatabaseOlympics.com
Article on Teuvo Laukkanen at age 89 
Teuvo Laukkanen's profile at Sports Reference.com

1919 births
2011 deaths
People from Pielavesi
Finnish male cross-country skiers
Olympic cross-country skiers of Finland
Cross-country skiers at the 1948 Winter Olympics
Olympic silver medalists for Finland
Olympic medalists in cross-country skiing
Medalists at the 1948 Winter Olympics
Sportspeople from North Savo
20th-century Finnish people